Ahmed (1466 – 24 April 1513) was a Şehzade (prince) of the Ottoman Empire, the eldest survived son of Sultan Bayezid II. He fought against his younger brother, Selim, in the Ottoman Civil War of 1509–1513 to succeed their father, and was a central figure in the Şahkulu rebellion. Ahmed ultimately lost the war against his brother, and was executed by Selim's order after the latter usurped the throne.

Background

Ahmed was the oldest living son of Bayezid II, the 8th sultan of the Ottoman Empire. His mother was Bülbül Hatun. In Ottoman tradition, all princes were required to serve as provincial (sanjak) governors in Anatolia (Asiatic part of modern Turkey) as a part of their training. Ahmed was the governor of Amasya, an important Anatolian city. Although the status was not official, he was usually considered as the crown prince during the last years of his father's reign, in part because of the support of the grand vizier, Hadim Ali Pasha.

Siblings

Ahmed had two living half-brothers. Of the two, Korkut was governing in Antalya and Selim (future sultan Selim I, known as Yavuz) in Trabzon. Custom dictated that whoever first reached Istanbul after the death of the previous sultan had the right to ascend to throne (although disagreements over who had arrived first very often led to civil wars between the brothers, most prominently displayed in the Ottoman Interregnum), so the distances from the sanjaks to Istanbul more or less determined the succession and usually whoever the previous sultan favored the most as his successor. In this respect, Ahmed was the most fortunate because his sanjak was the closest to Istanbul.

Although Selim's son Süleyman (future Suleiman the Magnificent) had been assigned to Bolu, a small sanjak closer to Istanbul, upon Ahmed's objection, he was relocated to Kaffa in Crimea. Selim saw this as an unofficial display of support for his elder brother and asked for a sanjak in Rumeli (the European portion of the empire). Although he was initially refused on the ground that Rumeli sanjaks were not offered to princes, with the support of the vassal Crimean khan Meñli I Giray, he was able to receive the sanjak of Semendire (modern Smederevo in Serbia), which, although it was technically in Rumeli, was quite far from Istanbul. Consequently, Selim chose to stay close to Istanbul instead of going to his new sanjak. His father Beyazıt thought this disobedience insurrectionist; he defeated Selim's forces in battle in August 1511, and Selim escaped to Crimea.

Şahkulu Rebellion

While Beyazıt was fighting against Selim, Ahmed was tasked with suppressing the Şahkulu Rebellion in Anatolia. However, instead of fighting, Ahmed tried to win over the soldiers to his cause for winning the Ottoman throne and left the battlefield. His attitude caused unease among the soldiers; more importantly, his main supporter, Hadim Ali Pasha, lost his life during the rebellion.

Capturing Konya

Hearing about Selim's defeat by their father, Ahmed declared himself as the sultan of Anatolia and began fighting against one of his nephews (whose father had already been dead). He captured Konya, and although his father Beyazıt asked him to return to his sanjak, he insisted on ruling in Konya. He also attempted to capture the capital; but he failed because the soldiers blocked his way, declaring their preference for a more able sultan. Selim then returned from Crimea, forced Bayazit to abdicate the throne in favor of himself, and was crowned as Selim I.

Defeat and death
Ahmed continued to control a part of Anatolia in the first few months of Selim's reign. Finally, the forces of Selim and Ahmed fought a battle near Yenişehir, Bursa on April 24, 1513. Ahmed's forces were defeated; he was arrested and executed shortly after.

Family

Consorts
Ahmed had at least seven consorts. Three of them are know:
Sittişah Hatun, mother of Şehzade Osman;
Gülçiçek Hatun (buried in Amasya)
Bülbül Hatun

Sons
Ahmed had at least seven sons:
Şehzade Murad (1495 -  1519, died of natural causes, Ardabil, buried near Shaykh Safi al-Din Ardabili), governor of Bolu. He had two sons and one daughter:
Şehzade Mustafa (killed by Selim I, 14 May 1513, Amasya);
Şehzade Mehmed (killed by Selim I, September–October 1512, Amasya);
Asitanşah Sultan;
Şehzade Süleyman (died of Plague, 24 April 1513, Cairo, buried in Havşi Sultan Mosque), governor of Koca, and Çorum 1509 – 1513, he had two daughters;
Şehzade Alaeddin (died of Plague, 14 May 1513, Cairo, buried in Havşi Sultan Mosque), governor of Bolu 1509 – 1513, married his cousin Neslişah Hanımsultan, the daughter of his aunt Aynışah Sultan, and Ahmed Mirza, and they had one daughter:
Hvandi Sultan, married to Sunullah Bey, governor of Kastamonu;
Şehzade Osman (killed by Selim I, 14 April 1513, Amasya, buried in Sultan Bayezid Mosque, Amasya) - with Sittişah Hatun, governor of Osmancık 1509 – 1513;
Şehzade Kasım ( 1501 – killed by Selim I, 30 January 1518, Cairo, buried in Havşi Sultan Mosque)
Şehzade Ali (1499 - 1513, killed by Selim I)
Şehzade Mehmed (1500 - 1513, killed by Selim I)

Daughters
Ahmed had at least four daughters:
Kamerşah Sultan, married, in 1508 to Damad Mustafa Bey, governor of Midilli, and son of Iskender Pasha;
Fatma Sultan, married, in 1508 to Damad Mehmed Bey, Ser-ulufeciyan (head of the Janissary Cavalry Corps), and son of Damad Koca Davud Pasha;
Fahrihan Sultan, married, in 1508 to Damad Suleiman Bey, Silahdar (keeper of the sword);
Fülane Sultan, married to Damad Ahmed Bey;

In popular culture
A fictionalized version of Ahmed appears as the main antagonist in the video game Assassin's Creed: Revelations, voiced by Tamer Hassan. The game, which is set during the Ottoman Civil War and the Şahkulu rebellion, portrays Ahmed as a calm and calculated strategist, unlike his more violent brother Selim, with whom he clashes because Ahmed was named the heir apparent to the Ottoman throne. He is also shown being close to his nephew Suleiman, Selim's son, who supports Ahmed in his efforts to become Sultan and disapproves of his father's methods. Near the end of the game, Ahmed is revealed to be the Grand Master of the Byzantine rite of the Templar Order, who sought to see the Ottoman Empire collapsed and replaced with the old Byzantine Empire, which is why he supported Manuel Palaiologos and Şahkulu in their respective plans. He also oversaw the excavation of an old library built by the Assassin Altaïr Ibn-LaʼAhad in Masyaf, which the Templars believed to contain the power to end all conflict and enslave humanity. In the final confrontation of the game, Ahmed is defeated by the protagonist Ezio Auditore da Firenze, and then killed by Selim by being pushed off a cliff. In the game, Ahmed's death occurs in 1512 rather than 1513.

References 

16th-century Ottoman royalty
1460s births

1513 deaths

Year of birth uncertain
Ottoman princes
Executed people from the Ottoman Empire
16th-century executions by the Ottoman Empire
Royalty from Istanbul
Executed royalty
Pretenders to the Ottoman throne